The 2012 Angola Basketball Super Cup (19th edition) was contested by Recreativo do Libolo, as the 2011 league champion and Petro Atlético, the 2011 cup runner-up. Recreativo do Libolo was the winner, making it its 1st title.

The 2012 Women's Super Cup (17th edition) was contested by Interclube, as the 2011 women's league champion and Desportivo do Maculusso, the 2011 cup runner-up. Interclube was the winner, making it its 5th title.

2012 Men's Super Cup

2012 Women's Super Cup

See also
 2012 Angola Basketball Cup
 2012 BAI Basket
 2012 Victorino Cunha Cup

References

Angola Basketball Super Cup seasons
Super Cup